LSW may stand for:

Places
 Landessternwarte Heidelberg-Königstuhl, a historic astronomical observatory operated by the Ruprecht Karl University of Heidelberg in Germany
 Leasowe railway station, a railway station in England
 Lee's Summit West High School, a high school in Lee's Summit, Missouri
 Lincoln Southwest High School, a high school in Lincoln, Nebraska
 Labrador Sea Water, part of the North Atlantic Deep Water water mass
Malikus Saleh Airport IATA code

Organizations
 Liberty Seguros-Würth team, a cycling team active in Tour de France
 Logistics Support Wing, one of three support wings of the Australian Air Force Cadets
 London and South Western Railway, a railway company operating in England from 1838 to 1922

Other
 Dragon Ball Z: Legendary Super Warriors, a Game Boy Color game and style used in sprite editing
 Lego Star Wars, a Lego theme which incorporates the Star Wars saga
 Light Support Weapon, a type of assault rifle
 Land Slide Warning, an alert type in the United States Emergency Alert System
 Licensed Social Worker
 LSW Vision-Smalltalk, a commercial implementation of the Smalltalk language and development environment for Windows
LSW, "Los Super Weones" a ex-Chilean rocket league professional team
LSW, "Little Sim World" new upcoming 2D life simulation game